Stenotabanus taeniotes is a species of horse flies in the family Tabanidae.

Distribution
Brazil.

References

Tabanidae
Taxa named by Christian Rudolph Wilhelm Wiedemann
Diptera of South America
Insects described in 1828